Calthwaite railway station in Hesket parish, was situated on the Lancaster and Carlisle Railway (the West Coast Main Line) between Carlisle and Penrith. It served the village of Calthwaite, Cumbria, England. The station opened , and closed on 7 April 1952.

The station
The station had two platforms, a signal box and a station master's house. The relatively sizeable goods yard had a weighing house, coal yard and cattle pens. Only the station master's house remains, as a private dwelling, the platforms have been demolished and the line has been electrified.

Stations on the line
The next station on the line towards Carlisle was Southwaite and the preceding station was Plumpton.

References
Notes

Sources

External links
Old Cumbria Gazetteer

Disused railway stations in Cumbria
Railway stations in Great Britain opened in 1855
Railway stations in Great Britain closed in 1952
Former Lancaster and Carlisle Railway stations
Inglewood Forest